Lori Lynn Menshouse (born February 9, 1973) is an American beauty queen and attorney from Ashland, Kentucky who has competed in the Miss America and Miss USA pageants.

Biography
Menshouse won the Miss Kentucky title in 1997 competing as Miss Ashland Area. She competed in the Miss America pageant held in September that year but did not place.

In 1998, less than a year after passing on her crown, Menshouse won the Miss Kentucky USA 1999 title, becoming one of few women from Kentucky who have held both titles. She went on to represent Kentucky in the Miss USA 1999 pageant held in Branson, Missouri on February 2, 1999. Menshouse did not place in the nationally televised pageant, which was won by Kimberly Pressler of New York.

In 2001, Menshouse sued the Miss Kentucky Scholarship Organization for failing to provide her with the full $10,800 in scholarship money that she had been awarded for winning the pageant.

Menshouse received her B.S., cum laude in biology with a minor in chemistry, in 1995 from Morehead State University. After working as a spokesperson for several organizations and companies, including the Kentucky Department of Agriculture, she received her J.D. from the University of Kentucky College of Law in 2003. While at Kentucky Law, she was a William Mills Scholar, on the editorial board of the Journal of Natural Resources and Environmental Law, a member of the moot court board and received the CALI award (highest grade in the class) in her patent class. She then became an associate in the Intellectual Property Litigation Group at the law firm of Alston and Bird in Atlanta, but she is no longer with the firm.

References

External links
 Miss Kentucky official website
 Miss Kentucky USA official website

1973 births
Living people
American lawyers
American women lawyers
Beauty pageants in Kentucky
Miss America 1998 delegates
Miss USA 1999 delegates
People from Ashland, Kentucky
University of Kentucky alumni
Miss Kentucky winners
20th-century American people
21st-century American women